Steel Rose may refer to:

 Steel Rose (novel), a 1997 fantasy novel by the American writer Kara Dalkey
 Steel Rose (manhua), a Taiwanese comic
 China women's national football team